William Adams (20 March 1897 – 5 December 1945) was a footballer who played in The Football League for Barrow and West Bromwich Albion. Adams also played for Newport County.

Adams later became the landlord of a local Black Country public house now known as The Bell Inn. It is located on Rood End Road, Rood End, Langley. Adams was later buried in Rood End Cemetery after his death.

References

Association football defenders
Barrow A.F.C. players
English footballers
People from Rowley Regis
English Football League players
West Bromwich Albion F.C. players
1897 births
1945 deaths
Newport County A.F.C. players